Nilanjana Sudeshna "Jhumpa" Lahiri (born July 11, 1967) is an American author  known for her short stories, novels and essays in English, and, more recently, in Italian.

Her debut collection of short-stories Interpreter of Maladies (1999) won the Pulitzer Prize for Fiction and the PEN/Hemingway Award, and her first novel, The Namesake (2003), was adapted into the popular film of the same name.

The Namesake was a New York Times Notable Book, a Los Angeles Times Book Prize finalist and was made into a major motion picture. Unaccustomed Earth (2008) won the Frank O'Connor International Short Story Award, while her second novel, The Lowland (2013), was a finalist for both the Man Booker Prize and the National Book Award for Fiction. On January 22, 2015, Lahiri won the US$50,000 DSC Prize for Literature for The Lowland In these works, Lahiri explored the  Indian-immigrant experience in America. In 2011, Lahiri moved to Rome, Italy and has since then published two books of essays, and in 2018, published her first novel in Italian called Dove mi trovo and also compiled, edited and translated the Penguin Book of Italian Short Stories which consists of 40 Italian short stories written by 40 different Italian writers. She has also translated some of her own writings and those of other authors from Italian into English.

In 2014, Lahiri was awarded the National Humanities Medal. She was a professor of creative writing at Princeton University from 2015 to 2022. In 2022, she became the Millicent C. McIntosh Professor of English and Director of Creative Writing at her alma mater, Barnard College of Columbia University.

Early and personal life
Lahiri was born in London, the daughter of Indian immigrants from the Indian state of West Bengal. Her family moved to the United States when she was three; Lahiri considers herself an American and has said, "I wasn't born here, but I might as well have been." Lahiri grew up in Kingston, Rhode Island, where her father Amar Lahiri worked as a librarian at the University of Rhode Island; the protagonist in "The Third and Final Continent", the story which concludes Interpreter of Maladies, is modeled after him. Lahiri's mother wanted her children to grow up knowing their Bengali heritage, and her family often visited relatives in Calcutta (now Kolkata).

When Lahiri began kindergarten in Kingston, Rhode Island, her teacher decided to call her by her familiar name Jhumpa because it was easier to pronounce than her more formal given names. Lahiri recalled, "I always felt so embarrassed by my name.... You feel like you're causing someone pain just by being who you are." Her ambivalence over her identity was the inspiration for the mixed feelings of Gogol, the protagonist of her novel The Namesake, over his own unusual name. In an editorial in Newsweek, Lahiri claims that she has "felt intense pressure to be two things, loyal to the old world and fluent in the new." Much of her experiences growing up as a child were marked by these two sides tugging away at one another. When she became an adult, she found that she was able to be part of these two dimensions without the embarrassment and struggle that she had when she was a child. Lahiri graduated from South Kingstown High School and received her B.A. in English literature from Barnard College of Columbia University in 1989.

Lahiri then earned advanced degrees from Boston University: an M.A. in English, an M.F.A. in Creative Writing, an M.A. in Comparative Literature, and a Ph.D. in Renaissance Studies. Her dissertation, completed in 1997, was titled "Accursed Palace: The Italian palazzo on the Jacobean stage (1603–1625)". Her principal advisers were William Carroll (English) and Hellmut Wohl (Art History). She took a fellowship at Provincetown's Fine Arts Work Center, which lasted for the next two years (1997–1998). Lahiri has taught creative writing at Boston University and the Rhode Island School of Design.

In 2001, Lahiri married Alberto Vourvoulias-Bush, a journalist who was then deputy editor of TIME Latin America, and who is now senior editor of TIME Latin America. In 2012, Lahiri moved to Rome with her husband and their two children, Octavio (born 2002) and Noor (b. 2005). On July 1, 2015, Lahiri joined the Princeton University faculty as a professor of creative writing in the Lewis Center for the Arts.

Literary career
Lahiri's early short stories faced rejection from publishers "for years". Her debut short story collection, Interpreter of Maladies, was finally released in 1999. The stories address sensitive dilemmas in the lives of Indians or Indian immigrants, with themes such as marital difficulties, the bereavement over a stillborn child, and the disconnection between first and second generation United States immigrants. Lahiri later wrote, "When I first started writing I was not conscious that my subject was the Indian-American experience. What drew me to my craft was the desire to force the two worlds I occupied to mingle on the page as I was not brave enough, or mature enough, to allow in life." The collection was praised by American critics, but received mixed reviews in India, where reviewers were alternately enthusiastic and upset Lahiri had "not paint[ed] Indians in a more positive light." Interpreter of Maladies sold 600,000 copies and received the 2000 Pulitzer Prize for Fiction (only the seventh time a story collection had won the award).

In 2003, Lahiri published her first novel, The Namesake. The theme and plot of this story was influenced in part by a family story she heard growing up. Her father's cousin was involved in a train wreck and was only saved when the workers saw a beam of light reflected off of a watch he was wearing. Similarly, the protagonist's father in The Namesake was rescued because his peers recognized the books that he read by Russian author Nikolai Gogol. The father and his wife emigrated to the United States as young adults. After this life-changing experience, he named his son Gogol and his daughter Sonali. Together the two children grow up in a culture with different mannerisms and customs that clash with what their parents have taught them. A film adaptation of The Namesake was released in March 2007, directed by Mira Nair and starring Kal Penn as Gogol and Bollywood stars Tabu and Irrfan Khan as his parents. Lahiri herself made a cameo as "Aunt Jhumpa".

Lahiri's second collection of short stories, Unaccustomed Earth, was released on April 1, 2008. Upon its publication, Unaccustomed Earth achieved the rare distinction of debuting at number 1 on The New York Times best seller list. New York Times Book Review editor, Dwight Garner, stated, "It's hard to remember the last genuinely serious, well-written work of fiction—particularly a book of stories—that leapt straight to No. 1; it's a powerful demonstration of Lahiri's newfound commercial clout."

Lahiri has also had a relationship with The New Yorker magazine, in which she has published short stories and non-fiction.

Since 2005, Lahiri has been a vice president of the PEN American Center, an organization designed to promote friendship and intellectual cooperation among writers.

In February 2010, she was appointed a member of the Committee on the Arts and Humanities, along with five others.

In September 2013, her novel The Lowland was placed on the shortlist for the Man Booker Prize, which ultimately went to The Luminaries by Eleanor Catton. The following month it was also long-listed for the National Book Award for Fiction, and revealed to be a finalist on October 16, 2013. However, on November 20, 2013, it lost out for that award to James McBride and his novel The Good Lord Bird.

In December 2015, Lahiri published a non-fiction essay called "Teach Yourself Italian" in The New Yorker about her experience learning Italian. In the essay she declared that she is now only writing in Italian, and the essay itself was translated from Italian to English. That same year, she published her first book in Italian, In altre parole, in which she wrote her book about her experience learning the language; an English translation by Ann Goldstein titled In Other Words was published in 2016.

Lahiri was the winner of the DSC Prize for South Asian Literature 2015 for her book The Lowland at the Zee Jaipur Literature Festival for which she entered Limca Book of Records.

In 2017, Lahiri received the PEN/Malamud Award for excellence in the short story.

In 2018, Lahiri published her first novel in Italian, Dove mi trovo (2018). In 2019, she compiled, edited and translated the Penguin Book of Italian Short Stories which consists of 40 Italian short stories written by 40 different Italian writers.

Literary focus
Lahiri's writing is characterized by her "plain" language and her characters, often Indian immigrants to America who must navigate between the cultural values of their homeland and their adopted home.
Lahiri's fiction is autobiographical and frequently draws upon her own experiences as well as those of her parents, friends, acquaintances, and others in the Bengali communities with which she is familiar. Lahiri examines her characters' struggles, anxieties, and biases to chronicle the nuances and details of immigrant psychology and behavior.

Until Unaccustomed Earth, she focused mostly on first-generation Indian American immigrants and their struggle to raise a family in a country very different from theirs. Her stories describe their efforts to keep their children acquainted with Indian culture and traditions and to keep them close even after they have grown up in order to hang onto the Indian tradition of a joint family, in which the parents, their children and the children's families live under the same roof.

Unaccustomed Earth departs from this earlier original ethos, as Lahiri's characters embark on new stages of development. These stories scrutinize the fate of the second and third generations. As succeeding generations become increasingly assimilated into American culture and are comfortable in constructing perspectives outside of their country of origin, Lahiri's fiction shifts to the needs of the individual. She shows how later generations depart from the constraints of their immigrant parents, who are often devoted to their community and their responsibility to other immigrants.

Television
Lahiri worked on the third season of the HBO television program In Treatment.  That season featured a character named Sunil, a widower who moves to the United States from India and struggles with grief and with culture shock.  Although she is credited as a writer on these episodes, her role was more as a consultant on how a Bengali man might perceive Brooklyn.

Awards
 1993 – TransAtlantic Award from the Henfield Foundation
 1999 – O. Henry Award for short story "Interpreter of Maladies"
 1999 – PEN/Hemingway Award (Best Fiction Debut of the Year) for "Interpreter of Maladies"
 1999 – "Interpreter of Maladies" selected as one of Best American Short Stories
 2000 – Addison Metcalf Award from the American Academy of Arts and Letters
 2000 – "The Third and Final Continent" selected as one of Best American Short Stories
 2000 – The New Yorkers Best Debut of the Year for "Interpreter of Maladies"
 2000 – Pulitzer Prize for Fiction for her debut "Interpreter of Maladies"
 2000 – James Beard Foundation's M.F.K. Fisher Distinguished Writing Award for "Indian Takeout" in Food & Wine Magazine
 2002 – Guggenheim Fellowship
 2002 – "Nobody's Business" selected as one of Best American Short Stories
 2008 – Frank O'Connor International Short Story Award for "Unaccustomed Earth"
 2009 – Asian American Literary Award for "Unaccustomed Earth"
 2009 – Premio Gregor von Rezzori for foreign fiction translated into Italian for "Unaccustomed Earth" ("Una nuova terra"), translated by Federica Oddera (Guanda)
 2014 – DSC Prize for South Asian Literature for The Lowland
 2014 – National Humanities Medal
2017 – Pen/Malamud Award

Works

Novels
 
 The Lowland (2013)

Short story collections

Interpreter of Maladies (1999) 
 "A Temporary Matter" (previously published in The New Yorker)
 "When Mr. Pirzada Came to Dine" (previously published in The Louisville Review)
 "Interpreter of Maladies" (previously published in the Agni Review)
 "A Real Durwan" (previously published in the Harvard Review)
 "Sexy" (previously published in The New Yorker)
 "Mrs. Sen's" (previously published in Salamander)
 "This Blessed House" (previously published in Epoch)
 "The Treatment of Bibi Haldar" (previously published in Story Quarterly)
 "The Third and Final Continent"

Unaccustomed Earth (2008) 
 "Unaccustomed Earth"
 "Hell-Heaven" (previously published in The New Yorker)
 "A Choice of Accommodations"
 "Only Goodness"
 "Nobody's Business" (previously published in The New Yorker)
 "Once In A Lifetime" (previously published in The New Yorker)
 "Year's End" (previously published in The New Yorker)
 "Going Ashore"
 "Hema and Kaushik"

Stories
 
 Lahiri, Jhumpa (January-29-2018). "The Boundary"  . The New Yorker. 
 Lahiri, Jhumpa (February-8-2021). "Casting Shadows"  . The New Yorker.

Poetry
 Il quaderno di Nerina (Italian) (2020)

Nonfiction

Books
 In altre parole (Italian) (2015) (English translation published as In Other Words, 2016)
 Il vestito dei libri (Italian) (English translation published as The Clothing of Books, 2016)
 Translating Myself and Others (2022)

Essays, reporting and other contributions
 The Magic Barrel: Stories (introduction) by Bernard Malamud, Farrar, Straus and Giroux, July 2003.
 "Cooking Lessons: The Long Way Home" (September 6, 2004, The New Yorker)
 Malgudi Days (introduction) by R.K. Narayan, Penguin Classics, August 2006.
 "Rhode Island" in State by State: A Panoramic Portrait of America edited by Matt Weiland and Sean Wilsey, Ecco, September 16, 2008
 "Improvisations: Rice" (November 23, 2009, The New Yorker)
 "Reflections: Notes from a Literary Apprenticeship" (June 13, 2011, The New Yorker)
 The Suspension of Time: Reflections on Simon Dinnerstein and The Fulbright Triptych edited by Daniel Slager, Milkweed Editions, June 14, 2011.

Translations
 Ties (2017), translation from Italian of Domenico Starnone's Lacci 
 Trick (2018), translation from Italian of Domenico Starnone's Scherzetto
 Trust (2021), translation from Italian of Domenico Starnone's Confidenza

See also

 Lists of American writers
 List of Indian writers
 Jhumpa Lahiri - Critical Biography

References

Further reading
 
 Cussen, John. “the william morris in jhumpa lahiri’s wallpaper / and other of the writer’s reproofs to literary scholarship,” JEAL:  Journal of Ethnic American Literature 2 (2012): 5-72.
 Das, Subrata Kumar. "Bengali Diasporic Culture: A Study of the Film Adaptation of Jhumpa Lahiri's The Namesake". The Criterion: An International Journal in English (ISSN 0976-8165) 4 (II), April 2013: np.
 
 Majithia, Sheetal (Fall/Winter 2001). "Of Foreigners and Fetishes: A Reading of Recent South Asian American Fiction." Samar 14: 52–53 The South Asian American Generation. 
 Mitra, Zinia. "Echoes of Loneliness: Dislocation and Human Relationships in Jhumpa Lahiri", Contemporary Indian Women Writers in English: Critical Perspectives. Ed. Nizara Hazarika, K.M. Johnson and Gunjan Dey.Pencraft International.(), 2015.
 Mitra, Zinia . " An Interpretation of Interpreter of Maladies", Jhumpa Lahiri : Critical Perspectives. Ed. Nigamananda Das. Pencraft International, 2008.() pp 95–104. 
 Reichardt, Dagmar. "Migrazione, discorsi minoritari, transculturalità: il caso di Jhumpa Lahiri", in: Scrivere tra le lingue. Migrazione, bilinguismo, plurilinguismo e poetiche della frontiera nell'Italia contemporanea (1980-2015), edited by Daniele Comberiati and Flaviano Pisanelli, Rome, Aracne, 2017, pp. 77–92.
 Reichardt, Dagmar. "Nomadische Literatur und Transcultural Switching: Jhumpa Lahiris italophones Migrationstagebuch 'In altre parole' (2015) – 'In Other Words' (2016) - 'Mit anderen Worten' (2017)", in: Eva-Tabea Meineke / Anne-Rose Mayer / Stephanie Neu-Wendel / Eugenio Spediacato (ed.), Aufgeschlossene Beziehungen: Italien und Deutschland im transkulturellen Dialog. Literatur, Film, Medien, "Rezeptionskulturen in Literatur- und Mediengeschichte" vol. 9 – 2019, Würzburg: Königshausen & Neumann, 2019, pp. 243–266.
 Reichardt, Dagmar. "Radicata a Roma: la svolta transculturale nella scrittura italofona nomade di Jhumpa Lahiri", in: I l pensiero letterario come fondamento di una testa ben fatta, edited by Marina Geat, Rome, Roma TRE Press, 2017, pp. 219–247. «Radicata a Roma»: la svolta transculturale nella scrittura italofona nomade di Jhumpa Lahiri | Reichardt | Il pensiero letterario come fondamento di una testa ben fatta
 Roy, Pinaki. "Postmodern Diasporic Sensibility: Rereading Jhumpa Lahiri's Oeuvre". Indian English Fiction: Postmodern Literary Sensibility. Ed. Bite, V. New Delhi: Authors Press, 2012. pp. 90–109.
 Roy, Pinaki. "Reading The Lowland: Its Highs and its Lows". Labyrinth (ISSN 0976-0814) 5(3), July 2014: 153–62.
 Palmerino, Gregory, “The Immigrant and the Child at Home: Chiasmus as a Narrative Technique in Jhumpa Lahiri’s “Mrs. Sen’s””, Journal of the Short Story in English [Online], 75 | Autumn 2020, Online since 01 December 2022. URL: http://journals.openedition.org/jsse/3394

External links

 
 Jhumpa Lahiri: A Bibliography, First Editions

American women non-fiction writers
American women essayists
American women novelists
American women short story writers
American women writers of Indian descent
American writers of Indian descent
American novelists of Indian descent
American short story writers of Asian descent
20th-century American women writers
21st-century American women writers
21st-century American non-fiction writers
21st-century American essayists
21st-century American novelists
20th-century American short story writers
21st-century American short story writers
American women academics
Princeton University faculty
Rhode Island School of Design faculty
Boston University faculty
Boston University College of Arts and Sciences alumni
Barnard College alumni
American expatriate academics
American expatriates in Italy
Italian-language writers
Exophonic writers
The New Yorker people
Hemingway Foundation/PEN Award winners
PEN/Malamud Award winners
National Humanities Medal recipients
Pulitzer Prize for Fiction winners
British emigrants to the United States
Novelists from New York (state)
Novelists from New Jersey
Novelists from Massachusetts
Writers from Brooklyn
Writers from Rhode Island
People from South Kingstown, Rhode Island
American Hindus
American people of Bengali descent
1967 births
Living people
O. Henry Award winners
Members of the American Academy of Arts and Letters